Elane dos Santos Rego (born 4 June 1968), commonly known as Elane, is a Brazilian retired footballer who played as a central defender for the Brazil women's national football team.

She represented Brazil at the FIFA Women's World Cup in 1991, 1995 and 1999; as well as in the inaugural Olympic women's football tournament in 1996.

Career
Elane was part of the EC Radar club team who represented Brazil at the 1988 FIFA Women's Invitation Tournament in Guangdong and finished in third place.

At the 1991 FIFA Women's World Cup Elane played in all three Group B games and scored Brazil's first ever World Cup goal in their 1–0 opening match win over Japan.

An aggressive central defender, Elane remained a key player for Brazil at the 1999 FIFA Women's World Cup, by which time she was playing for São Paulo FC. A tournament preview on the SoccerTimes.com website described her as a strong tackler with modest speed. At the 1995 FIFA Women's World Cup in Sweden, English journalist Pete Davies, covering the tournament for The Independent, caricatured Elane's committed approach:

At club level Elane also played for São Cristóvão, Bonsucesso, Portuguesa, EC Radar, Santos, Corinthians, São Paulo and Saad Esporte Clube, ending her career in 2001 with Barra de Teresópolis (RJ).

After her football career Elane worked as a bus driver in her native Rio. She was named equal seventh (with Meg) in the International Federation of Football History & Statistics (IFFHS) South America's best Women's Footballer of the Century list.

References

External links
 

1968 births
Living people
Footballers from Rio de Janeiro (city)
Olympic footballers of Brazil
Footballers at the 1996 Summer Olympics
1995 FIFA Women's World Cup players
1991 FIFA Women's World Cup players
Women's association football defenders
Brazil women's international footballers
Brazilian women's footballers
EC Radar players
1999 FIFA Women's World Cup players
São Paulo FC (women) players